The 2020 Dublin Senior Football Championship was the 134th edition of Dublin GAA's premier gaelic football tournament for senior clubs in County Dublin, Ireland. 32 teams participate (16 in Senior 1 and 16 in Senior 2), with the winner of Senior 1 representing Dublin in the Leinster Senior Club Football Championship.

Ballyboughal won the 2019 I.F.C. and were promoted along with I.F.C. finalists Trinity Gaels to Senior 2. They replaced St. Patrick's Palmerstown and Round Towers Clondalkin who were relegated to the 2020 I.F.C.

Round Towers Lusk won the Senior 2 Championship and were promoted along with finalists Whitehall Colmcille to Senior 1. They replaced St. Brigid's and St. Sylvester's who were relegated to the 2020 SFC2.

Senior 1
The team named first in Rounds 1 and 2 in each group will have home advantage. Round 3 will see teams play at neutral venues.

Group 1

Round 1

Round 2

Round 3

Group 2

Round 1

Round 2

Round 3

Group 3

Round 1

Round 2

Round 3

Group 4

Round 1

Round 2

Round 3

Quarter-finals

 Kilmacud Crokes 4-15 , 1-12 St. Vincent's, Parnell Park, 29/8/2020,
 St. Jude's 1-17 , 1-10 Skerries Harps, Parnell Park, 29/8/2020,
 Ballyboden St. Enda's 2-16 , 0-16 Raheny, Parnell Park, 30/8/2020,
 Ballymun Kickhams 1-18 , 2-13 Na Fianna, Parnell Park, 30/8/2020,

Semi-finals

 Ballyboden St. Enda's 2-11, 1-11 St. Judes, Parnell Park, 12/9/2020,
 Ballymun Kickhams 1-18 , 2-12 Kilmacud Crokes, Parnell Park, 13/9/2020,

Final

 Ballymun Kickhams 1-19- 0-08 Ballyboden St. Enda's 0-08, Parnell Park, 27/9/2020

Match Report

Relegation play-offs
 Games not played due to COVID-19 pandemic

Senior 2
The team named first in Rounds 1 and 2 in each group will have home advantage. Round 3 will see teams play at neutral venues.

Group 1

Round 1

Round 2

Round 3

Group 2

Round 1

Round 2

Round 3

Group 3

Round 1

Round 2

Round 3

Group 4

Round 1

Round 2

Round 3

Quarter-finals

Semi-finals

Final

Relegation play-offs
 Games not played due to COVID-19 pandemic

References

External links
Dublin GAA Fixtures & Results

Dublin Senior Football Championship
Dublin Senior Football Championship
Dublin SFC